Phlake is a Danish R&B and soul group, consisting of Mads Bo (vocals) and Jonathan Elkær (beats). The group released their first single in 2015, called "So Faded", which had some success in Denmark, but did not enter the official single chart. However on 16 October 2015, the single "Pregnant" was released and entered the Danish singles chart at number 9. The official international music video for "Pregnant" was released on YouTube by Sony Music on 11 March 2016. The video was also released in several countries, with the song gaining recognition in Sweden. They have also played at Norwegian music festival By:Larm.

History
The group was created in 2015 when Jonathan Elkær, a member of Tabu Records and creating beats for Danish band Suspekt, wanted to do something new. He then met singer, Mads Bo. Together, they paired up and called themselves Phlake. An R&B group with elements of soul, the group has achieved several successful singles in Denmark.

Discography

Albums

Singles

Album content

References

Danish male singers
English-language singers from Denmark